Juan Pablo Torres may refer to:
 Juan Pablo Torres (musician) (1946–2005), Cuban trombonist, bandleader, arranger and producer
 Juan Pablo Torres (soccer) (born 1999), American soccer player

See also
 Juan Torres (disambiguation)